Up from the Ashes is the first solo studio album by Don Dokken, best known as the lead singer of American glam metal band Dokken. The sound of the album continues the more commercial sound that Dokken began to incorporate into their music with Under Lock and Key.

The album did not quite achieve the commercial success achieved by Dokken, but it did reach the Top 50 on the Billboard 200 album chart in the US. The line-up for this album consisted of Don Dokken performing vocals, John Norum formerly of Europe on lead guitar, Billy White formerly of Watchtower on lead guitar, Peter Baltes formerly of Accept on bass, and Mikkey Dee formerly of King Diamond and subsequently of Motörhead on drums. The original drummer for the Don Dokken band was Hempo Hildén, formerly in John Norum's band but he was replaced after a few photo sessions and does not play on the album.
The music videos for the songs "Stay" and "Mirror Mirror" received airplay on MTV's Headbangers Ball. "When Love Finds a Fool" was co-written with former Deep Purple and Black Sabbath singer Glenn Hughes, who also provided backing vocals for the song.

For the album, Don Dokken "[had] a rule", that all the band members must live in the same house.

Track listing

Personnel
 Don Dokken – lead vocals, guitars
 John Norum – lead guitars, backing vocals
 Billy White – lead guitars
 Peter Baltes – bass guitar, backing vocals
 Mikkey Dee – drums, percussion

Additional musicians
 Glenn Hughes – backing vocals on 	"When Love Finds a Fool"
 Tony Franklin – bass intro on  "Stay"
 Ken Mary - Drums on "The Hunger"

Production
 Wyn Davis - producer, engineer
 Eddie Ashworth, Melissa Sewell - engineers
 George Marino - mastering at Sterling Sound, New York
 Glen LaFerman	- photography
 Gabrielle Raumberger  - art coordinator
 Greg Stata - 	art direction
 David E. Williams - cover art
 Tom Zutaut - executive producer

Charts

Album

Singles

References

Don Dokken albums
1990 debut albums
Geffen Records albums